Crambidia casta, the pearly-winged lichen moth, is a moth of the family Erebidae. It was described by Packard in 1869. It is found from North Carolina and Kentucky north to Nova Scotia. In the west it occurs from the Rocky Mountain states south to central Arizona and New Mexico. The habitat consists of eastern hardwood forests, juniper woodlands and sagebrush rangelands

The wingspan is about 30 mm. The forewings are pure white with a satiny sheen. The hindwings are duller white.

The larvae feed on lichens.

References

Lithosiina
Moths described in 1869
Moths of North America